Nichols v Jessup [1986] 1 NZLR 226, is a New Zealand case regarding unconscionable bargains, and it set the threshold for an unconscionable bargain is that the stronger party did not have to have actual knowledge of the other party having a disability (to negotiate), but merely that the stronger party should have had suspicions that the other party had a disability.

Background
Eileen Jessup, a nurse in her 60s, owned a house on Great North Road in Auckland, that had a full street frontage. Paul Nichols, a manager of a real estate agency in Australia, owned the house on the back section, and its sole access was a 3.66 meter easement over Nichols property. This means of access was deemed to be unsatisfactory to Nichols. To rectify this Nichols proposed to Jessup that they amalgamate both their respective driveways, which would improve the value of the back property by $45,000 due to the fact that the improved access would let Nichols to build up to 12 flats on that property, and reduce the value of front property by $3,000 as the widened driveway would now come up to inches of the side of her house.

For reasons not stated, Jessup agreed to this, although later at trial Jessup was referred to by the judge as “unintelligent and muddle-headed” and “ignorant about property matters”.

Matters come to a head when Nichol's solicitors noticed that Jessup had signed the agreement under her maiden name, and they resent the contract to her to be signed under her married name, for which she refused to do.

Later Jessup, presumably unhappy at the one sided agreement, applied to the courts to have the whole agreement set aside.

Decision
The Court of Appeal of New Zealand ruled that as Nichols was a real estate agent, they ought to have known of the substantial imbalance in the transaction.

Cooke P stated

As a footnote, this decision was just made after the Privy Council had made the ruling in O'Connor v Hart which also involved unconscionable bargains, and which reversed a previous ruling of McMullins J, who was a judge at this trial.

References

Court of Appeal of New Zealand cases
New Zealand contract case law
1986 in New Zealand law
1986 in case law